NS Stations is a Dutch company that owns and manages over 400 railway stations in the Netherlands. It is a subsidiary of national rail operator Nederlandse Spoorwegen (NS). A subsidiary company of NS Stations is NS Stations Retailbedrijf (formerly Servex; founded in 1973), which uses the brands Automaten, Brasserie Het Station, Burger King (taken over by HMSHost), Café T, Café T espresso, C'est du pain, HEMA, Kiosk, La Place (taken over by HMSHost), mr. Pizza, Pizza Hut, Restauratie, Rituals, Smullers, Swirl's, and Wizzl, and owns Stationsfoodstore, which is an Albert Heijn franchise operating about 22 "AH to go" convenience stores on stations. Wizzl also sells train tickets. They are typically at small stations which have no separate ticket window or counter; an exception is Rotterdam, with a Wizzl at the back side of the station, while separate ticket windows are at the front side only.

References

External links 
  

Nederlandse Spoorwegen
Railway companies of the Netherlands